Amina Hydari (1878–1939) was an Indian social worker. In 1908, she received the Kaisar-i-Hind Medal, the first woman recipient, for her work during the Great Musi Flood of 1908. The wife of former Prime Minister of Kingdom of Hyderabad Akbar Hydari, she founded the Lady Hydari Club in 1929 and Mahboobia Girls School, the first girls' school in the State. Her uncle was the lawyer and congressman Badruddin Tyabji.

Social life
She founded the Lady Hydari Club in 1929 exclusively for women.

See also
 Akbar Hydari
 Aditi Rao Hydari

References

1878 births
1939 deaths
Social workers
Indian Ismailis
Sulaymani Bohras
Women from Hyderabad State
People from Hyderabad State
19th-century Indian educators
20th-century Indian educators
Women educators from Andhra Pradesh
Educators from Andhra Pradesh
19th-century women educators
20th-century women educators
Recipients of the Kaisar-i-Hind Medal

Tyabji family
Social workers in British India